Zeff is a surname.

Notable people with the surname include:
Dan Zeff, British television director
Leo Zeff (1912-1988), American psychologist
Edward Zeff (1904–1974), British agent of the Special Operations Executive 
Stephen A. Zeff (born 1933), American economist